Wild Belle is an American band, composed of siblings Elliot Bergman and Natalie Bergman. They appeared on Conan on November 26, 2012. Their debut album, Isles, was released by Columbia Records on March 12, 2013. They have released three songs from the album: "Keep You" in February, "Backslider", and "It's Too Late". Their song "Shine" was featured on the soundtrack of the 2013 movie The Way, Way Back and in Grey's Anatomy season 9, episode 13. Their song "Keep You" was played in the movie "Pitch Perfect" and in "The Vampire Diaries" season 4, episode 3. In 2015 Wild Belle worked with Diplo and DJEMBA DJEMBA to write "Be Together", which is the first track off Major Lazer's third album Peace Is the Mission. The song is about a potential, but unlikely relationship. The film clip for "Be Together" depicts a widow and her partner's funeral, with flash backs to the day he dies in a motorcycle accident.

Background
Elliot and Natalie Bergman are two of four children born to musician Judson Bergman and writer and literary scholar Susan Bergman (née Heche), who brought them up in a house full of music. Elliot, the older sibling, is a multi-instrumentalist who studied at the University of Michigan where he started an Afrobeat band called Nomo. His younger sister, Natalie, started performing with Nomo, playing tambourine and singing backing vocals when she was sixteen.

This collaboration came about almost by accident. NOMO's Elliot Bergman had spent the better part of the summer building and recording electric kalimbas in Brooklyn, when label-mate, producer/multi-instrumentalist Shawn Lee asked him to send over a kalimba track for his new album. Lee, based in London, added some funky drums, bass and a smattering of steel drums, and sent it back to Bergman. When Bergman's sister, Natalie, heard the instrumental track destined for Shawn's album, she decided that she had to add some vocals. She stayed up all night writing the tune and recorded the vocals in Garage Band. The happy result is a great groove called "Upside Down", and NOMO's first vocal tune in ages.
Elliott and Natalie decided to branch off with their own project and chose the name, Wild Belle.

Career

2013: Isles
Their debut album, entitled Isles, was released on March 12, 2013. It received its title due to every track "resembling its own island", drawing in influences from reggae, soul, and jazz music.

2015–2018: Dreamland
On August 2, 2015 during an interview with radio station WXRT, they announced that their second studio album would be titled Dreamland. The album was released on April 15, 2016. The lead single from Dreamland, "Giving Up on You" was released on September 16, 2015.

2019–present: Everybody One of a Kind
On January 23, the group premiered on KCRW's Morning Becomes Eclectic and shared the video of the lead single "Mockingbird" off their upcoming album.

The second single "Have You Both" was released on February 14.

The duo released their third single "Rocksteady" on March 8 as they announced that their third album Everybody One Of A Kind will be released on March 22.

Discography

Albums

EPs 
 It's Too Late EP (2012)
 Wild Belle (2013)
 Isles (Remix EP) (2013)

Singles 

 "Keep You" (2010)
 "It's Too Late" (2012)
 "Another Girl" (2013)
 "Giving Up On You" (2015)
 "Giving Up On You - Ticklah Remix" (2015)
 "Throw Down Your Guns" (2016)
 "Throw Down Your Guns - Dub" (2016)
 "Our Love Will Survive" (2016)
 "Untamed Heart / Morphine Dreamer" (non-album single; 2017)
 "Hurricane / Paralyzed" (non-album single; 2017)
 "Mockingbird" (2019)
 "Have You Both" (2019)
 "Rocksteady" (2019)

References

External links

American musical duos
American pop rock music groups
Columbia Records artists
Musical groups established in 2011
Musical groups from Illinois
Rock music duos
Sibling musical duos
2011 establishments in Illinois